Petr Bohačík is a professional Czech basketball player playing for BK JIP Pardubice. He was twice honoured to be part of All Star Game (2007 and 2011). He has been a member of the Czech Republic national basketball team, competing in the 2005 FIBA Europe Under-20 Championship, 2009 EuroBasket, and the 2011 EuroBasket.

Bohačík started the 2010–11 season strongly, scoring 88 points in his first 8 matches, including 19 points against Svitavy, and being singled out by Czech news agency iDNES.cz as star of the league. He went on to score 15 points for Pardubice in a 70–50 win over Děčín in March 2011. He finished the season being nominated for the All Star Game.

References

External links 
Profile at eurobasket.com

1985 births
Living people
Czech men's basketball players
Power forwards (basketball)
Sportspeople from Opava